The Denmark men's national under-16 basketball team is a national basketball team of Denmark, administered by the Danmarks Basketball Forbund. It represents the country in men's international under-16 basketball competitions.

FIBA U16 European Championship participations

See also
Denmark men's national basketball team
Denmark men's national under-18 basketball team

References

External links
Official website 
Archived records of Denmark team participations

Basketball teams in Denmark
Men's national under-16 basketball teams
Basketball